Trichilia chirriactensis is a species of plant in the family Meliaceae. It is endemic to Guatemala.

References

chirriactensis
Endemic flora of Guatemala
Taxonomy articles created by Polbot